Oqoltin is an urban-type settlement in Andijan Region, Uzbekistan. It is the administrative center of Ulugʻnor District. The town population was 6,522 people in 1989, and 5,700 in 2016.

References

Populated places in Andijan Region
Urban-type settlements in Uzbekistan